Gary John McSwegan (born 24 September 1970) is a Scottish former professional footballer. A striker, he began his career with Rangers, leaving to join Notts County in England. He returned to Scotland and had spells with Dundee United, Heart of Midlothian and Kilmarnock. Later in his career he went on to play for Ross County, Inverness Caledonian Thistle, and Clyde. He made two international appearances for Scotland whilst a Hearts player.

Career

Domestic
McSwegan was born in Glasgow and started his career with Rangers, where he scored 5 goals in only 24 appearances during his six years at Ibrox, including a goal against Marseille in the 1992-93 Champions League. His first team opportunities at Rangers, however, appeared to be limited and in 1993 he joined Notts County for £400,000. One of his highlights at Notts County was scoring twice as they knocked Premier League side Tottenham Hotspur out of the 1994–95 Football League Cup. After two seasons in England he returned to Scotland with Dundee United for £375,000 where he remained for three seasons, scoring 42 goals.

He joined Hearts in 1998 on a free transfer where he scored 31 goals in 98 appearances. By 2002, however, McSwegan had fallen out of favour at Hearts and subsequently had loan spells in England with Barnsley and Luton Town before joining Kilmarnock where he remained for two seasons, scoring 17 goals.

His next professional club was Ross County where he played 39 games, scoring just 1 goal against Queen of the South in two injury-ravaged seasons. Despite these problems, McSwegan returned to top flight football, when signed by Inverness Caledonian Thistle in September 2006 on a short-term deal. McSwegan left Inverness Caledonian Thistle at the end of the 2006–07 season and joined Peterhead.

McSwegan joined Clyde on 14 March 2008, after previously training with the club and appearing in reserve games. He made his debut the following day, in a 1–1 draw against Stirling Albion in the Scottish First Division. He scored his first goal for the club in the final league game of the season, scoring the first in a 3–0 win over Stirling Albion. He then went on to score two goals in their successful relegation playoffs in ties against Alloa and Airdrie. In June 2008, McSwegan signed a one-year contract extension with the Broadwood side. He scored three goals in his second season, with two goals against Queen's Park in the League Cup and a late winner in the league against Livingston. This meant that all six of his goals for Clyde came in the Broadwood Stadium. McSwegan was released by Clyde in June 2009 along with the rest of the out of contract players, due to the club's financial position.

International
McSwegan won two caps for Scotland in 1999. He won his first cap on 5 October 1999, coming on as a late substitute in a EURO 2000 qualifier against Bosnia and Herzegovina, which Scotland won 1–0. His second and final cap came four days later, against Lithuania. McSwegan started the game, and scored Scotland's second goal in a 3–0 victory.

McSwegan also coaches young people throughout Glasgow in his role with coaching and groupwork company A&M Training.

International goals
Scores and results list Scotland's goal tally first.

Career statistics
After 25 October 2008

See also
Clyde F.C. season 2007–08 | 2008–09

References

External links
Notts County ex-player interview: Gary McSwegan

Living people
1970 births
Footballers from Glasgow
Scottish footballers
Scotland international footballers
Rangers F.C. players
Notts County F.C. players
Dundee United F.C. players
Heart of Midlothian F.C. players
Barnsley F.C. players
Luton Town F.C. players
Kilmarnock F.C. players
Ross County F.C. players
Inverness Caledonian Thistle F.C. players
Clyde F.C. players
Scottish Premier League players
Scottish Football League players
English Football League players
Preston North End F.C. non-playing staff
Association football forwards